Albert Planchon (2 March 1905 – 27 July 1989) was a French sports shooter. He competed in the 100 m running deer event at the 1952 Summer Olympics.

References

1905 births
1989 deaths
French male sport shooters
Olympic shooters of France
Shooters at the 1952 Summer Olympics
Place of birth missing
Sport shooters from Paris
20th-century French people